Giovani Darnei Martins da Rosa (born 7 January 1992), known as Giovani da Rosa, is a Brazilian footballer who plays for Passo Fundo, as a striker.

Career
Born in Viamão, Rio Grande do Sul, Rosa career started in the youth ranks of Internacional. In 2013, he joined Campeonato Gaúcho team, Esporte Clube Novo Hamburgo on a loan deal, helping them advance to the quarter-finals of 2013 season.
In 2014, he moved to Copa do Nordeste side, América Futebol Clube (RN), but did not compete.

In July 2014, Giovani made his first move abroad, joining Primeira Liga club, Vitória de Setúbal.
After six months, he returned to Brazil, again competing in Campeonato Gaúcho, in Clube Esportivo Aimoré. Afterwards he signed with Lajeadense in November 2015, Sergipe in March 2016 and Passo Fundo in December 2016.

International career
Rosa was part of his nation under-17 side that competed in the 2009 FIFA U-17 World Cup.

References

External links
 
 

Living people
1992 births
Sportspeople from Rio Grande do Sul
Brazilian footballers
Association football forwards
Campeonato Brasileiro Série B players
Sport Club Internacional players
Fluminense FC players
Esporte Clube Novo Hamburgo players
América Futebol Clube (RN) players
Vitória F.C. players
Macaé Esporte Futebol Clube players
Club Sportivo Sergipe players
Primeira Liga players
Brazilian expatriate footballers
Expatriate footballers in Portugal